Procedural generation is a common technique in computer programming to automate the creation of certain data according to guidelines set by the programmer. Many games generate aspects of the environment or non-player characters procedurally during the development process in order to save time on asset creation. For example, SpeedTree is a middleware package that procedurally generates trees which can be used to quickly populate a forest. Whereas most games use this technique to create a static environment for the final product, some employ procedural generation as a game mechanic, such as to create new environments for the player to explore. The levels in Spelunky are procedurally generated by rearranging premade tiles of geometry into a level with an entrance, exit, a solvable path between the two, and obstacles to that path. Other games procedurally generate other aspects of gameplay, such as the weapons in Borderlands which have randomized stats and configurations.

This is a list of video games that use procedural generation as a core aspect of gameplay. Games that use procedural generation solely during development as part of asset creation are not included.

List

Roguelike games

Games in the roguelike genre all have at least procedurally generated levels.

Other

References

Procedural generation
 
Procedural generation